Blueslide is an unincorporated community in Pend Oreille County, in the U.S. state of Washington.

History
A post office called Blueslide was established in 1906, and remained in operation until 1926. The community was named for a landslide near the town site.

References

Unincorporated communities in Pend Oreille County, Washington
Unincorporated communities in Washington (state)